John R. Alford is a political science professor at Rice University, known for his research with John R. Hibbing in the field of genopolitics. He has also testified as an expert witness in several court cases pertaining to Congressional redistricting in Texas.

References

External links
Faculty page

Living people
Rice University faculty
American political scientists
University of Houston alumni
University of Iowa alumni
Year of birth missing (living people)